Ladigesia roloffi, the Sierra Leone dwarf characin, is a species of African tetra that is found in Sierra Leone and Liberia. It is the only member of its genus.

The fish was named in honor of German aquarist Erhard Roloff (1903-1980), who collected the type specimen.

In aquarium
Ladigesia roloffi can be found as an aquarium fish under name jellybean tetra. They prefer soft, acidic water. They will take standard flake food.

References

Characidae
Monotypic fish genera
Freshwater fish of West Africa
Taxa named by Jacques Géry
Fish described in 1968